Brisbin may refer to:

Places
Canada
 Brisbin, Saskatchewan
United States
 Brisbin, Montana
 Brisbin, Pennsylvania

People
 Anna Brisbin, American YouTuber known for her channel Brizzy Voices
 James Sanks Brisbin (1837-1892), American soldier
 John B. Brisbin (1827-1898), American lawyer and politician

Disambiguation pages with surname-holder lists